The Government of Karnataka announced the Rajyotsava awards for the year 2014. The awardees included 59 noted eminent individuals from various fields on the occasions of the 59th anniversary of the Karnataka state formation day.  The awards were given away at the Ravindra Kalakshetra in Bangalore on 1 November 2014.  The 2014 awards saw 1924 nominations that were screened by a panel. Karnataka Chief Minister Siddaramiah announced that the government would bring out commemorative postal stamps of the 59 awardees.

List of awardees
The Rajyotsava award winners for the year 2014 are:

Individual

Organisations/Associations

References

Rajyotsava Award
Recipients of the Rajyotsava Award 2014